Stefan Karagiosov was an industrialist and philanthropist from Tarnovo, Bulgaria.

Biography  
Stefan Karagiosov was born in 1818 in the village of Prisovo near Tarnovo (today Veliko Tarnovo). The elder  son of  Nedjo Karagiosov and Anastsija. He had three brothers – Nikoli, Dimitar and Angel.

Working experience and activities  
Stefan Karagiosov studied in Tarnovo. All the four brothers started own business – merchants in Tarnovo and  Constantinople (today Istanbul). In 1860 Stefan Karagiosov established the first factory in Tarnovo for bread alcohol from maize. In 1861 Stefan Karagiosov built the first silk factory in Tarnovo with his business partner Doino Vichenti from Bergamo (Italy). They bought machines from Italy and developed their entrepreneurship.  Since 1862 the silk factory opened branch in Gabrovo. In 1869 Doino Vichenti left Bulgaria and Stefan Karagiosov became the only owner of the two factories in Tarnovo and Gabrovo.
Stefan Karagiosoff built a bid and powerful flour-mill in Tarnovo. Using the scraps of food from the mill and bread alcohol company, Stefan Karagiosov fattened 250 – 300 animals per year.

Charity  
Stefan Karagiosov donated  a lot of money for different charity organizations, schools, churches and monasteries in Tarnovo and the region.

Other activities 
Stefan Karagiosov was the first master in Tarnovo and member of the  Tarnovo municipality, adviser of the Turkish governor in Tarnovo.

Family 
Stefan Karagiosov had three children – two sons and one daughter. The daughter Venka married general  Stefan P. Salabashev. The  son Krastjo  was born in 1860 in Tarnovo. He lived in Kjustendil and worked as a governor of the town during the First World War.  The son Nikola was born in Tarnovo too. He was a soldier in Sofia after graduating the Military Academy  in Russia. Stefan Karagiosov is an uncle of  Vasil Nikolov Karagiosov.

Sources 
 Колева Елена, Колева Ивелина, „Мястото на фамилия Карагьозови в историята на България“, сп. Минало, бр. 2, 2011
 Енциклопедия България, С.1982, с.330
 "Бележити търновци", С.1985 г., с. 170
 Д-р Цончев Петър, "Из стопанското минало на Габрово",Габрово, 1929;1996,с.329
 Д-р Цончев Петър, "Из общественото и културно минало на Габрово - исторически приноси", Габрово, 1934/1996 г., с.705
 "Човеколюбива болница на светите безсребреници Козма и Дамян", "Цариградски вестник" Тонков Тихомир по материали от ТДА - ВТ, "Велико Търново отблизо",бр. 61, април-май/2008 г., с.6-7
 Николов Григор, "По пътя от богатството до Бога", сп. "Мениджър - преди и след пърлвия милион", октомври 2008, с.80
 инж. Карагьозова Веселинка, "Биографична справка за Васил Карагьозов", Габрово, 2006 г.
 Карагьозов Божидар, "Чудният даскал - първият европеец в Габрово",в-к "Габрово днес",бр.19/22.03.1991 г.,с.8
 Кираджиев Светлин,"Велико Търново", С.2007, с.43
 Радев Иван, "История на Велико Търново XVIII - XIX век", "Слово", В.Т., 2000, стр.605

1818 births
1879 deaths
Bulgarian philanthropists
People from Veliko Tarnovo
Bulgarian businesspeople
19th-century Bulgarian people
19th-century Bulgarian businesspeople
19th-century philanthropists